Christen Elster (1763–1833) was a Norwegian civil servant and politician.  He served as the County Governor of Nordland county from 1811 until 1815.  He was then appointed as the County Governor of Nordre Trondhjem county from 1815 until his death in 1833. His descendants include Kristian Elster (born 1841) and Kristian Elster (born 1881).

References

1763 births
1833 deaths
County governors of Norway
County governors of Nordland